The Greek Maratos Brothers' have built a small number of vehicles in Thessaloniki. These include a rather innovative motorcycle in 1950, as well as two light three wheeler types.  

The Maratos family spread throughout Greece and some now live in Victoria in Australia.

References 
Michalis Arvanitopoulos, 'History of Motorcycles in Greece', published in  the Greek 'MOTO' magazine (1994 issues).
L.S. Skartsis, "Greek Vehicle & Machine Manufacturers 1800 to present: A Pictorial History", Marathon (2012)  (eBook)

Motorcycle manufacturers of Greece